Pandan cake is a light, fluffy, green-coloured sponge cake flavoured with the juices of Pandanus amaryllifolius leaves.
It is also known as pandan chiffon. The cake is popular in Indonesia, Malaysia, Singapore, Vietnam, Cambodia, Laos, Thailand, Sri Lanka, Hong Kong, China, and also the Netherlands, especially among the Indo community, due to its historical colonial ties with Indonesia. It is similar to the buko pandan cake of the Philippines, but differs in that it does not use coconut.

Ingredients
The cake shares common ingredients with other cakes, which includes flour, eggs, butter or margarine, and sugar. However, the distinct ingredient is the use of pandan leaf, which gives the cake its distinct green colouration. The cakes are light green in tone due to the chlorophyll in the leaf juice. It sometimes contains green food colouring to further enhance its colouration. The cakes are not always made with the leaf juice, as they can be flavoured with Pandanus extract, in which case colouring is only added if a green colouration is desired.

The original pandan cake common in Indonesia, the Netherlands, and Singapore is a usually soft sponge cake akin to the light and fluffy chiffon cake, made without any additional coating or frosting. The other variants are actually derived from other cake recipes, with any similarity only in the usage of green pandan flavouring extract.

History and origin
In Southeast Asia, cake-making techniques were brought into the region through European colonization. Indonesia was formerly a Dutch colony, whilst Malaysia and Singapore were British possessions. European colonists brought their cuisine along with them, with the most obvious impacts in bread, cake, and pastry-making techniques.  In Southeast Asian cuisine, the pandan leaf is a favourite flavouring agent used to give off a pleasant aroma, and added to various dishes ranging from fragrant coconut rice, traditional cakes, to sweet desserts and drinks. It was the fusion of European cake-making techniques with locally grown ingredients that created the pandan-flavoured cake.

In 2017 CNN named the pandan cake as the national cake of Singapore and Malaysia. This has led to reactions in Indonesia that regarded the pandan cake, locally known as kue bolu pandan, as Indonesian. In Singapore pandan cake was popularised by one of the city's most popular bakeries, Bengawan Solo, a cake shop owned by a Singaporean citizen of Indonesian origin. 

According to CNN Indonesia, this cake originated from Indonesia, which can be traced to the cake-making techniques of Dutch colonists in the Dutch East Indies (now Indonesia). The colonial Dutch and Indo peoples combined cake-making techniques from Europe with the available local ingredients like the pandan leaf as flavouring and colouring agents. This cake is also known as pandan cake in Dutch, and is quite popular in the Netherlands due to its historical link to Indonesia. Other than its use in chiffon pandan cake, pandan leaf is also used as green colouring and flavouring in the Dutch-Indonesian favourite pandan spekkoek or lapis legit (layered cake), demonstrating the prominence of pandan leaf in Dutch-Indonesian cake and pastry making.

Names in different languages

Indonesian: bolu pandan
Malaysian: kek pandan
Dutch: pandan cake
Khmer: Num Sleok Touy
Vietnamese: Bánh pho sĩ, "bánh lá dứa"
Cantonese: 
Thai: เค้กใบเตย

See also

Kue bolu
Coconut cake
Ube cake
Mango cake
Mamón

References

Indonesian breads
Kue
Sponge cakes